The Chameria national football team represents Cham Albanians of Chameria, a coastal part of Epirus, Greece. It is not affiliated with FIFA or UEFA and therefore cannot compete for the FIFA World Cup or the UEFA European Championship.

History

First match
The Chameria national football team was formed during mid-2017 and has played a number of friendly matches. On 17 June 2017, the first one that was simultaneously also the first biggest win and the first-ever competitive win was against Iraqi Kurdistan in the framework of the 2017 Unrepresented Nations Cup and the match ended with a 6–0 home win.

Membership in CONIFA
On 24 May 2018, Chameria was accepted in CONIFA and would now play in the various tournaments and individual matches against other national teams.

On 2 June 2019, Chameria played its first international match after the membership in CONIFA against Abkhazia in the framework of the 2019 CONIFA European Football Cup and the match ended in a 3–1 defeat, that was simultaneously also the biggest defeat and the first defeat of Chameria.

Competitive record

UNPO World Cup

CONIFA European Football Cup
On 20 February 2019, in Krakow, it was decided that Chameria should be part of Group 2 of the 2019 CONIFA European Football Cup, together with Abkhazia and County of Nice. On 22 May 2019, CONIFA announced that County of Nice was withdrawing from competition and Chameria's group would include Sápmi and the host country Artsakh, as well as Abkhazia. On 2 June 2019, Chameria debuted at the CONIFA European Football Cup with an away match, losing to Abkhazia 3–1.

Fixtures and results

2017

2019

Players

Current squad
The following players have been called up for the 2019 CONIFA European Football Cup.

Head-to-head records against other countries

Managers

References

External links
 

national football team
CONIFA member associations
European national and official selection-teams not affiliated to FIFA
Chameria national football team
Chameria